Isobornyl acetate is an organic compound consisting of the acetate ester or the terpenoid isoborneol.  It is a colorless liquid with a pleasant pine-like scent, and it is produced on a multi-ton scale for this purpose.  The compound is prepared by reaction of camphene with acetic acid in the presence of a strongly acidic catalyst such as sulfuric acid.  Hydrolysis of isobornyl acetate gives isoborneol, a precursor to camphor.

Like many plant exudates, isobornyl acetate appears to have antifeedant properties.

References

Acetate esters
Terpenes and terpenoids